Patrick Cybulski (born April 19, 1997), known by his stage name K?d (pronounced "kid"), is an American electronic musician and DJ. He is known for his single "Lose Myself" (featuring Phil Good), which charted on the US Billboard Dance/Mix Show Airplay at #40, as well as his single "Distance" (featuring Blair), which peaked at #16 on the aforementioned chart. He is also known for his remixes of popular electronic songs, most significantly "Doin' It Right" by Daft Punk and "Renaissance" (featuring Clairity) by Steve James.

Career

2015: Early releases 

On May 18, 2015, Cybulski released the single "Gold Blood" on record label Only Delusions. A month later, on June 25, Cybulski released a second single "Space Cowboy" on the same record label.

On July 9, 2015, Cybulski released the single "Bits & Pieces" as a collaboration with Kuiters on the record label Trillers. On July 20, 2015, Cybulski released two singles on two different record labels: "Zero Zero" on Onstreet, and "Keepo" on Icon.

On August 1, 2015, Cybulski released the track "Paperplane" on record label Too Lush, as a part of the label's compilation album Too Lush Vol. 4, which released that day. On August 24, 2015, Cybulski self-released the single "Cardinal" with Kuiters, with whom he had previously collaborated on "Bits & Pieces".

On November 11, 2015, Cybulski self-released a remix of "The Touch" by Kolaj.

2016: Popular remixes 

On January 6, 2016, Cybulski released his remix of "Renaissance" by Steve James (featuring Clairity). EDMTunes described the remix as "akin to the likes of Zedd or Madeon". Months later, on April 8, the remix would be featured on Steve James' remix package for Renaissance, released through Ultra Music, alongside other remixes of the song from ARMNHMR, Myles Travitz, and Paxel.

On January 29, 2016, Cybulski released a remix of "This Ain't Over" by Alex Newell on Big Beat Records. The remix was featured on Newell's This Ain't Over (Remixes) EP, alongside remixes from Odd Mob, TKDJS, Autolaser, and PVC.

On March 25, 2016, Cybulski released a remix of "Cliffs Edge" by Hayley Kiyoko.

Cybulski released a remix of "Fallen" (feat. Desirée Dawson) by ARMNHMR on April 5, 2016, on Far East Movement's record label, brednbutter. Later, on April 13, Cybulski released a remix of "Red Lips" (featuring Sam Bruno) by GTA. Less than two weeks after "Red Lips," Cybulski released a remix of "What You Need" by The Weeknd on April 26. On May 3, 2016, Cybulski released a remix of "Doin' It Right" by Daft Punk.

On May 23, 2016, Cybulski released his first self-released solo single "Somewhere Far Away from Here," featuring singer Lolaby. The track was praised for its reminiscence to the style of Porter Robinson's Worlds. Following "Somewhere Far Away," Cybulski released another solo single, "Show Me," featuring vocalist/rapper Rahn Harper, on June 14.

On June 28, 2016, Cybulski released the single "Amaretto" as a collaboration with Luca Lush. Two weeks later, on July 11, Cybulski released a remix of "Elevated" by RKCB. On July 20, Cybulski released a remix of "Youth" by Manila Killa, featuring Satica. The remix was featured on Manila Killa's Youth (Remixes) alongside a remix from Qrion. A week after "Youth," Cybulski released yet another remix, this one of "Happy" by Annabel Jones.

On August 8, 2016, Cybulski released the single "Discover", featuring RKCB, on record label PRMD Records. The track was premiered by Billboard on release. The song's lyric video was released on August 16, 2016

Cybulski released a remix of "4AM" by Huntar on August 22, 2016. On September 15, he released the single “Birth of the Universe”. He released another single, "Forgotten" on October 6, 2016.

On October 26, 2016, Cybulski released the single "Mortem". Later, on November 7, Cybulski released a remix of "Sad Machine" by Porter Robinson. Two months later, on December 13, Cybulski released a remix of "It's All On U" by Illenium.

2018: Find Paradise EP 
On October 5, 2018, Cybulski released his six-track debut extended play, Find Paradise. The EP comprises many genres, including dubstep, future bass, drum & bass, hardstyle and industrial techno. Through an emailed statement to Billboard, Cybulski stated that he "did not want to stick to a specific theme for [his] first project" to ensure listeners will not label a specific genre to his name. He continued: "I guess my main goal is to push music to new boundaries, even if it means getting backlash for it."

Discography

Albums

Extended plays

Singles

Remixes

References 

American DJs
American electronic musicians
Living people
1997 births
Electronic dance music DJs